Q5 is an American hard rock/heavy metal band from Seattle, Washington, who formed in 1983. Their first studio album, titled Steel the Light, came out in 1984. Picking up some critical praise, the outfit toured with the likes of Lita Ford and Twisted Sister. However, the group faced internal divisions that ultimately ended the project before the 1980s came to a close. In 2014, Q5 re-formed to perform at the Sweden Rock Festival, and the band members involved found that the one-off event was not enough, deciding to continue on with the revamped version of the group.

Biography
Q5 started in 1983. It functioned as a kind of 'supergroup' of sorts by mixing together members of two popular Seattle bands of the time. Frontman Jonathan K and guitarist Floyd D. Rose from "C.O.R.E." (or "The C.O.R.E.") joined up with guitarist Rick Pierce, bassist Evan Sheeley, and drummer Gary Thompson from "TKO". Their first studio album, 1984's Steel the Light, earned praise from several critics. Q5 signed on with Polygram for their 1985 sophomore release, When the Mirror Cracks, but the writing was already on the wall. Personal differences ripped the group apart not long after said release.

The band has featured a melodic hard rock sound incorporating heavy metal influences, with its songs being covered by the likes of Great White and Wolf. Ex-member Floyd Rose is also better known as the inventor of the guitar locking tremolo system.

Members

Current line-up
Jonathan Scott K. – lead vocals
Turner Williams-guitar
Chris Eger – guitar
Chance White – keyboard
Greg McClellan – bass
Morgan Williams – drums

Founding members
Jonathan Scott K. – lead vocals
Floyd D. Rose – guitar
Rick Pierce – guitar
Gary Thompson – drums
Evan Sheeley – bass/keyboard

Reunion tour line-up 2014–2019
Jonathan Scott K. – lead vocals
 Rick Pierce-Guitar
Dennis Turner – guitar
James Nelson guitar
Evan Sheeley – bass
Jeffrey A. McCormack – drums

Discography

Albums
1984 – Steel the Light (Music For Nations)
1985 – When the Mirror Cracks (Polygram)
2016 – New World Order (Frontiers Records)

Demos
1983 – Demo
1984 – Demo 1984

Singles
1985 – "Steel the Light"
1986 – "Living on the Borderline"
2016 – "The Right Way"

References

Hard rock musical groups from Washington (state)
Heavy metal musical groups from Washington (state)
Musical groups established in 1983
Music for Nations artists
Frontiers Records artists
PolyGram artists